Liparus is a genus of beetles belonging to the family Curculionidae. The species of this genus are found in Europe.

Species:
 Liparus abietis Germar, 1824 
 Liparus anglicanus Billberg, 1820 
 Liparus dirus (Herbst, 1795)

References

Curculionidae
Curculionidae genera